Miguel Ángel Herrera Equihua (born 3 April 1989) is a Mexican professional footballer who plays as a centre-back for Liga MX club Pachuca.

Club career

Pachuca
Herrera began his football career at Pachuca in 2008. He progressed through the ranks having successful seasons with the youth teams until he was called up to the first team in 2012. He made his first appearance with the first team during a Cup match against Leones Negros on 25 July 2012 that resulted in a 0–1 loss.

He made his league debut with Pachuca during the Apertura 2012 season on 4 August 2012 under coach Hugo Sánchez against Querétaro coming in as a substitute for Miguel Gerardo Velázquez in the 78th minute of the game, the match ended in a 1–0 win, with Herrera participating 12th minutes of the game. Throughout his debut season the Apertura 2012 season he played two more games (which he started). During his second season with Pachuca he became a regular starter as first choice center back after week 5 of the Clausura 2013 season. He made it to the League final against León, losing 4–3 in extra time, during that season. He demonstrated great ability to defend, and great flair which led to a call-up to the Mexico national team.

Herrera scored his first goal for Pachuca during a Cup match against La Piedad on 21 August 2012 which resulted in a 1–1 tie for Pachuca, and scored his first league goal against Tigres UANL on 27 July 2013 winning the match 2–1.

Monterrey
On 28 November 2015, Rayados de Monterrey announced that Herrera had been transferred to Monterrey on a season-long deal, in exchange for Stefan Medina.
At the end of the season Herrera returned to Pachuca where he was later loaned to UANL.

International career
Miguel Ángel received his first call-up by coach Miguel Herrera to the national team in October 2013 for a friendly against Finland and for the Intercontinental play-offs against New Zealand but failed to make an appearance.

Herrera received his second call-up to the national team for two friendlies against Chile on 6 September and Bolivia on 9 September 2014.

Herrera made his debut with the national team 6 September 2014, starting the match and playing the entire 90 minutes against Chile which ended in a score-less tie. In this match Herrera recovered six balls and only failed to complete 1 out of 21 passes reaching a 95% success rate (20 completed passes).

Career statistics

Club

International

Honours
Tigres UANL
Liga MX: Apertura 2016

Mexico
CONCACAF Gold Cup: 2015

References

External links
 
 
 

1989 births
Living people
Association football defenders
C.F. Pachuca players
C.F. Monterrey players
C.D. Veracruz footballers
Liga MX players
Mexico international footballers
Footballers from Michoacán
Mexican footballers
People from Uruapan
2015 CONCACAF Gold Cup players
CONCACAF Gold Cup-winning players